Tusen och en natt is a 1999 album from Swedish dansband Wizex. The album included Charlotte Nilsson's hit "Tusen och en natt/Take Me to Your Heaven", and the album sold 235,000 copies. The album peaked at #16 at the Swedish album chart.

Track listing
Tusen och en natt
Blå, blå är kärleken
Ett brev du aldrig får
En del av mig
Ingenting är bättre
Rena rama vilda västern
Hem genom stan
Vem följer med vem
Var är du nu?
Mer än hela dig
Om du var min
Gör min himmel blå
Macherita
Min morgon efter regn
Take Me to Your Heaven

Charts

References

1999 albums
Wizex albums